Wiley mill refers to a specific group of grinding mills manufactured under the name Thomas Scientific. The term Wiley as it relates to cutting or grinding mills is a registered trademark of Arthur H. Thomas Company. These mills prepare materials for analysis with minimal moisture loss. Well-dried samples are preferred. In the grinding mill, the material is loaded cut into crude pieces or lumps and loaded into a hopper.  From the hopper, the material drops by gravity into the path of a set of revolving hard tool steel blades driven by an electric motor.  The revolving knives work against stationary knives and the resulting powder is forced through a steel screen.  The powdered material then drops into a waiting collection vessel underneath.

The Wiley mill is most commonly used in agriculture and soil science laboratories but can be used on a wide variety of materials.  The Wiley mill was originally designed for grinding fertilizer materials, animal hair, hoofs and other materials. The hard, tool steel cutting edges on the knives which allows for milling of a wide range of materials, including plastics.

References

Laboratory equipment